Rampage is a 1986 arcade game by Bally Midway. Players take control of a trio of gigantic monsters trying to survive against onslaughts of military forces. Each round is completed when a particular city is completely reduced to rubble. Warner Bros. currently owns all rights to the property via their purchase of Midway Games. Inspired by monster films, Rampage spawned five sequels and a film adaptation in 2018.

Gameplay

Up to three simultaneous players control a trio of humans transformed into gigantic animalistic monsters due to various experiment-related accidents: George, who was transformed into a King Kong-like gorilla by an experimental vitamin, Lizzie, who was transformed into a Ymir-like reptile by a radioactive lake, and Ralph, who was transformed into a giant bipedal wolf by a food additive. The monsters must raze all buildings in a high-rise city to advance to the next level, eating people and destroying helicopters, tanks, taxis, police cars, boats, and trolleys along the way.

The player can climb any of the buildings, punching them to pieces and reducing them to rubble. Non-playable human characters within the levels can also be punched or grabbed and food items can be eaten. The player's monster receives damage from enemy bullets, sticks of dynamite, shells, punches from other monsters, and falls. Health is recovered by eating food items such as fruit, roast chicken, or soldiers. If a monster takes too much damage, it reverts into naked human form and starts walking off the screen sideways, covering its body with its hands. In this state, players can be eaten by another monster. If the player continues, the human mutates back into the monster or (if the human walked off the screen) flies in on a blimp (but has lost their score), with a full life bar.

Smashing open windows generally reveals an item or person of interest, which may be helpful or harmful. Helpful items include food or money, while dangerous ones include bombs, electrical appliances, and cigarettes. Some items can be both; for example, a toaster is dangerous until the toast pops up, and a photographer must be eaten quickly before he dazzles the player's monster with his flash, causing it to fall. When a civilian is present waving their hands at a window signaling for help, a player's points rapidly increase when the person is grabbed. Each monster can hold only one type of person: George can hold women, Lizzie can hold middle-aged men, and Ralph can hold businessmen.

Rampage is set over the course of 128 days in cities across North America. The game starts in Peoria, Illinois and ends in Plano, Illinois. In Plano, players receive a "mega vitamin bonus" which heals all the monsters and provides a large point bonus. After this, the cycle of cities repeats five times. After 768 days, the game resets back to Day 1. As game developer Brian F Colin stated "the hardware couldn't support that much art and we never figured anyone would get through 768 levels".

Some of the home port versions of the game start in San Jose, California and end in Los Angeles, California after going all around North America. The rampage travels through various cities across the United States, as well as two Canadian cities. Out of the 50 US states, only Connecticut, Delaware, Mississippi, New Hampshire, Rhode Island, South Carolina, and Vermont are spared from the monster rampage.

Development
The game's lead designers were artist Brian Colin and programmer Jeff Nauman. Neither of them being fans of arcade games at the time, Colin conceived Rampage as a game in which there was "no wrong way to play". To this end, he wanted to eschew the common video game concepts of having a set objective, competing for a high score and dying. Artist Sharon Perry, game tester Jim Belt and composer Michael Bartlow assisted with developing the game. The game's aim of destroying skyscrapers was created because the developers could only move rectangular shapes in the background. The developers had to work within the technical limitations of the time - cities are largely identical in appearance, Ralph and George are the same character palette and head swapped and the dust effect from crumbling buildings conceals glitchy animation. The game's development and release languished as management was unconvinced of the game's unusual concept of casting players as city-destroying monsters, but picked up after new management was installed at the company. Post-release, additional levels were added to the game to make it more difficult. In the opening cutscene reporting on three humans who had mutated into the monsters, Colin put pictures of himself as George, his wife Rae as Lizzy, and Nauman as Ralph.

Conceiving a graphically impressive title within the technical constraints of Midway's then current arcade hardware, designer Brian Colin took inspiration from the monster films King Kong and 20 Million Miles To Earth. Decades after the game released, Colin addressed a popular misconception that Lizzie was based on Godzilla, stating that Lizzie was actually based on the Ymir from 20 Million Miles to Earth; he said Godzilla would've been too large to fit into the size constraints of the game, and that he preferred Harryhausen and Willis O’Brien films over kaiju films such as Godzilla.

Release and ports
The game was released for the arcades in 1986. Colin promoted the game via a press release sent to local media outlets in each of the towns mentioned in-game; the press release took the form of an unofficial memo from Bally/Midway that stated that their town was "slated for destruction".

Rampage was ported to the Apple II, Atari 2600, Atari 7800, Atari Lynx, Atari 8-bit, Atari ST, Amiga, Commodore 64, MS-DOS/IBM PC, ZX Spectrum, Amstrad CPC, NES, Sega Master System and Tandy Color Computer 3. The Atari Lynx version adds a special fourth character named Larry, a giant rat. The NES version excludes Ralph, reducing the number of monsters to two. In 1997 Tiger Electronics released a handheld LCD version of the game. In 2017, Basic Fun released a mini arcade port of the NES version of the game with Ralph added. This was #10 of their Arcade Classics line.

The original arcade version of Rampage was included in various compilations. In 1999 it was included in Arcade Party Pak for the PlayStation. In 2003 it was included in Midway Arcade Treasures, a compilation of arcade games for the Nintendo GameCube, PlayStation 2, and Xbox. In 2005 it was included in Midway Arcade Treasures: Extended Play for the PlayStation Portable. In 2006 it was a bonus feature in Rampage: Total Destruction. In 2012, it was included in the compilation Midway Arcade Origins.

The game was also an unlockable in the 2015 game Lego Dimensions. In that game, a human-sized version of George the ape appears in one of the sidequests. In the Midway Arcade World level of the game, the player aids him in wrecking the area and protecting him from civilians to get a higher score than Ralph and Lizzie. Also in Gamer Kid’s level “Retro Wreckage”, at the end of the level, the Gamer Kid finds a Rampage arcade game, but while he’s checking it out, the virus that makes all the other arcade game characters come to life hits Gamer Kid and he turns into George before playing the arcade game.
 
In July 2000, Midway licensed Rampage, along with other Williams Electronics games, to Shockwave for use in an online applet to demonstrate the power of the shockwave web content platform, entitled Shockwave Arcade Collection. The conversion was created by Digital Eclipse. Rampage was also ported to iOS as part of the Midway arcade app.

In 2018, Arcade1Up released a mini 4-foot version of the original arcade cabinet.

Unlike the original arcade game, most of the home ports (such as the NES, Sega, and Atari Lynx versions) actually end, rather than repeating levels endlessly.

Reception

The game was a financial success in arcades, and one of the last successful titles for Bally/Midway.

Computer Gaming World approved of the MS-DOS adaptation of Rampage, especially for those with computers faster than the original IBM PC and an EGA video card. It stated that "Rampage is proof that IBM games can compete with other machines in running entertainment software".

Your Sinclair said it was "all great fun for a while but being a monster can become a drag. So unless you intend to play it three-handed, when the fun factor increases a little, or you're a monster fan of the original, you might just give this a miss for something with more lasting value".

Atari Lynx
CVG Magazine reviewed the Atari Lynx version of the game in their March 1991 issue, giving it a score of 60% score. Robert A. Jung reviewed the game which was posted to IGN Entertainment in July 1999. In his final verdict he wrote that "a lighthearted, silly game that's lots of fun for lots of players (the more the merrier)", giving a final score of 9 out of 10.

Sequels
In 1997, Rampage World Tour was released, developed for Midway by the original designers, Brian Colin and Jeff Nauman. It was followed by the console-exclusive games  Rampage 2: Universal Tour, Rampage Through Time, and Rampage Puzzle Attack. The last game in the series made by Midway was Rampage: Total Destruction.

A 2018 arcade reboot was made by Adrenaline Amusements for Warner Bros., based on the 2018 Rampage film. Initially released exclusively for Dave & Buster's, it includes redemption game mechanics.

Film adaptation

A theatrical film adaptation based on the game was developed by Warner Bros and New Line Cinema, directed by Brad Peyton and starring Dwayne Johnson with John Rickard and Beau Flynn as producers. The film was released on April 13, 2018.

References

External links

1986 video games
Amiga games
Amstrad CPC games
Arcade video games
Atari Lynx games
Atari 2600 games
Atari 7800 games
Atari 8-bit family games
Atari ST games
Commodore 64 games
Game Boy Advance games
Head-to-head arcade video games
Master System games
Midway video games
Multiplayer and single-player video games
Nintendo Entertainment System games
Parody video games
Rampage (franchise)
Science fiction video games
Video games developed in the United States
Video games scored by Alex Rudis
Video games scored by Ben Daglish
Video games featuring female protagonists
ZX Spectrum games
Video games set in the United States